The Orgueilleux was a First Rank three-decker ship of the line of the French Royal Navy. She was initially armed with 88 guns, comprising twenty-eight 36-pounder guns on the lower deck, thirty 18-pounder guns on the middle deck, and twenty-four 8-pounder guns on the upper deck, with six 6-pounder guns on the quarterdeck, but an extra pair of 8-pounders was added soon after completion. By 1706 one pair of 36-pounders had been removed and an extra pair of 6-pounders added on the quarterdeck to maintain the 90-gun rating.

Designed and constructed by Laurent Coulomb, she was begun at Lorient Dockyard in June 1690 and launched on 29 March of the following year. She was completed in May 1691 and took part in the Battle of Barfleur on 29 May 1692, in the Battle of Lagos on 28 June 1693, and in the Battle of Velez-Malaga on 24 August 1704.

The Orgueilleux was among the fifty warships scuttled at Toulon on Louis XIV's orders during the Siege of Toulon in July 1707, but was subsequently refloated. She was condemned at Toulon on 11 March 1713, and by Order of 1 December 1715 she was taken to pieces - the work being completed by August 1716.

References

Nomenclature des Vaisseaux du Roi-Soleil de 1661 a 1715. Alain Demerliac (Editions Omega, Nice – various dates).
The Sun King's Vessels (2015) - Jean-Claude Lemineur; English translation by François Fougerat. Editions ANCRE.  
Winfield, Rif and Roberts, Stephen (2017) French Warships in the Age of Sail 1626-1786: Design, Construction, Careers and Fates. Seaforth Publishing. . 

Ships of the line of the French Navy
1690s ships
Ships built in France